The Externals Also known as The High lords are a group of fictional characters appearing in American comic books published by Marvel Comics. Considered a rare subspecies of mutants, most of them were X-Men antagonists.  The original, unused name for the group was to be The Prophets, as seen on the back of the Sunspot & Gideon trading card included with X-Force #1. The characters first appeared in X-Force #10 (May 1992).

Background
The Externals are all mutants with the additional gift of immortality and, as expressed by Cable, they play an important role in the future and Apocalypse's rise to power. Their true origins are scattered throughout history, but it is known that they all share a psychic link with each other that separates them from other immortals as it allows them to not only sense each other and where, but allows them to summon each other at will from great distances and also allows them to sense when one rises from the dead and when one is killed. Saul, Absalom, Gideon, Nicodemus, Burke, Selene, Candra, and Crule (to a lesser extent) formed the self-fashioned "High Lords", bent on playing power games and manipulating events behind the scenes. Crule was employed as an enforcer and assassin for the other High Lords, while Candra and Selene preferred to play their own schemes separately and didn't take any part in the High Lords’ gatherings.

Each External was claimed to represent an intangible concept:
 Absalom - despair 
 Burke - fortitude 
 Candra - guile 
 Cannonball - hope (His status as an External is still unclear, while his awakening was felt by all the other Externals, Selene and more recently Cable, had stated that Cannonball is not an External)
 Crule - ferocity 
 Gideon - opportunity
 Nicodemus - wisdom 
 Saul - patience
 Selene - corruption 
 Apocalypse - evolution

At one point, X-Men regular and former New Mutant Cannonball was declared an External by Cable. Later, Selene betrayed her fellow Externals and despite the efforts of X-Force, she managed to slay them by absorbing their life forces. Selene ultimately escaped, but not before summarily dismissing the assumption that Cannonball was an External, calling into question Cable's conclusion and the reasons for it. Yet, more recently, Cannonball was shot three times through the chest by Reverend Stryker's Purifiers, and was back up and around in a matter of hours. When asked about it, Hank McCoy mentioned Cannonball's status as an immortal again, though it's not sure if he was joking or not. Apocalypse has also been referred to as an External on several occasions; his longevity is believed by Selene to be mostly due to technological means, although Apocalypse was already many centuries old before his first encounter with the technology he would later integrate himself with. To note, Selene herself needs to maintain her supply of life force that she drains from human victims.

More recently however it was revealed that all Externals previously believed to have been killed by Selene or the Legacy Virus had in fact survived. As it turns out, apparently the only way of effectively killing an External is by destroying their hearts but when that happens the life-force of the slain External is channeled into the others making them virtually all powerful. Selene reveals she didn't accomplishing this deed herself because she could not handle the stress that came with it. Also, Selene's assumptions about Cannonball and Apocalypse not being part of the Externals cannot be taken lightly as she mentions to be a total of seven Externals when there's actually eight. Evidently, even after death, as long as there are at least two Externals alive in the same timeframe, those who died will simply be revived to life and health, as was the case seen with Burke, who was killed by the future version of Gideon only to be reborn as a baby with purple eyes because the present versions of Selene and Gideon were alive. More recently it was confirmed that Apocalypse is indeed an External and the performer of the process that created Candra's gem alongside Selene and the other High lords eons ago.

Later following the creation of a mutant nation on Krakoa, Apocalypse decided this as the right time to rescue his first Horsemen. He summoned his fellow Externals, Selene, Crule, Gideon, Saul, Candra, Nicodemus and Absolom, to the Eternal Caldera on Krakoa. Revealing his intentions to sacrifice some of their life energy to power the Arak Maw Gate, Apocalypse—along with Selene, Gideon and Absolom, who are revealed to be a part of his plan—quickly turns on their fellow immortals. With the unexpected help of Rictor, the group is actually able to wipe out four of the Externals and extract their life energy to fuel the crystals that powered the gateway to Arakko.

It is later revealed by Apocalypse's own grandson Summoner (son of Apocalypse's daughter War) and Apocalypse's wife Genesis (Summoner's grandmother and War's mother) that the mutant known only as the "White Sword", the Champion of Okkara (the living continent that was once the single mutant homeland on Earth) and an Omega-level healer with his own personal army of One Hundred Champions, composed of all the warriors he has personally defeated and then resurrected as his followers, is also an External.

Other versions

Askani 
In (Earth-4935), the Externals were purged by Apocalypse who ascended to power and gained control of the entire planet up until the 39th century.

Age of Apocalypse 
In the alternate reality created when the time traveling Legion killed his own father, it's unknown what happened with the Externals as only a few had made their presence known as soldiers of Apocalypse. Candra, Selene and Gideon were recruited as the first wave of Horsemen of Apocalypse.

In other media

X-Men: The Animated Series 
 In the episode "Sanctuary Part 2", Saul and Gideon are seen watching Fabian Cortez announce his scheme to the Earth.
 In the episode "Externally Yours", Gambit's past involvement with the respective guilds of Thieves and Assassins, as well as with the External Candra (merely known as "The External") are detailed.

References

X-Men supporting characters

it:Mutante (Marvel Comics)#Externi